Retro is a 2002 box set of music by the English band New Order. It comprises four themed CDs. In the UK, initial quantities came with a fifth disc which featured tracks with limited release numbers.

History
The box set was released as a compromise. The band's manager, Rob Gretton, had originally envisioned a box set called Recycle, which would feature all the singles New Order had released, one single per CD, in a grand 20 CD box. However, London Records deemed this excessive, and the idea was shelved. New Order released Get Ready in 2001 and a year later Retro surfaced.

The CDs each have a particular theme: Pop, Fan, Club and Live. Each one was selected by a friend of the band.
 
The idea of the limited edition fifth bonus disc was hatched as a direct result of online protestation that the Recycle project had been abandoned. Fans of the band saw the Retro track listing as a disappointing cash-in exercise as it offered nothing rare or noteworthy, and no tracks that weren't already widely available on CD. Dissent voiced on the NewOrderOnline message board caught the eye of the band's management who negotiated with HMV to fund the limited run of 3000 discs that were included in initial copies of the box set sold exclusively by their UK stores.

Track listing
All songs written by New Order, except where noted.

Charts

References

New Order (band) compilation albums
Albums produced by Stephen Hague
Albums produced by Steve Osborne
Albums produced by Martin Hannett
2002 compilation albums
London Records compilation albums
London Records live albums
New Order (band) live albums
2002 live albums
Albums produced by John Robie